Teikyo School may refer to:
 Teikyo University Junior & Senior High School
 Teikyo Fuji Junior and Senior High School
 Teikyo Asaka High School
 Teikyo Nagaoka High School
 Teikyo Fifth High School
 Teikyo School United Kingdom